The General Commander of the Military Forces is the professional head of the Military Forces of Colombia. He is responsible for the administration and the operational control of the Colombian military. The current commander is General Luis Fernando Navarro Jiménez.

List of Chiefs

References

Military of Colombia
Colombia